"Dolce Vita" is a song by Italian musician Ryan Paris, released as a single in 1983. The song was composed by Pierluigi Giombini, keyboardist of "I Like Chopin" and "Masterpiece". It reached the top 10 in many countries. The music video was filmed on-location in Paris.

Composition
Interviewed for the book Europe's Stars of '80s Dance Pop Vol. 2, composer Pierluigi Giombini explained the evolution of the song:
It was Gazebo who suggested I should write a song inspired by the title of the famous film. [...] So I began to work on it right away, starting with the bass line on the Minimoog, and then I wrote the melody on top of that. Later, Gazebo wrote the lyrics. [...] I did the arrangement in a couple of days and did the vocals and mix-down in another three days. The synths were basically the same - Minimoog, OB-8, ARP Odyssey and the Oberheim DMX drum machine. We also used our real hands over the snare.

Interviewed in 2007, Paris described the background to the recording of the song:
I remained folgorated by the sounds and the melodies of Giombini and I said to him: "I will bring you one of my English songs". That night I composed a new song and three days later I presented it to Giombini who loved the song. We worked on my song two times and one day Giombini told me: "I wrote a song for you but it is not a rock song". When I heard the song I really made a big jump because it was very nice.

Track listing and formats 

 Italian 7-inch single

A. "Dolce Vita (Vocal)" – 4:28
B. "Dolce Vita (Instrumental)" – 4:09

 Italian 12-inch single

A. "Dolce Vita (Vocal)" – 7:33
B. "Dolce Vita (Instrumental)" – 7:55

 German 7-inch single

A. "Dolce Vita, Part I (Vocal)" – 3:59
B. "Dolce Vita, Part II (Instrumental)" – 2:48

 German 12-inch maxi-single

A. "Dolce Vita, Part I (Vocal)" – 7:33
B. "Dolce Vita, Part II (Instrumental)" – 8:37

Other versions
There have been least 49 separate releases, in different countries, across different formats, between 1983 and 2009. Countries of release have included Italy, Mexico, UK, Germany, Canada, Portugal, Spain, France, Brazil, Peru, US, Netherlands, Benelux and Sweden. Among the notable versions are:
 1983, 12", Maxi, Italy, Discomagic Records: MIX 117
 1983, 12", Extended Disco Mix, UK, Carrere, Clever: CART 289
 1983, 12", Maxi, Original Version, Germany, Carrere: 815 396-1
 1984, 12", Promo, USA, Carrere: 4Z9 04236

A new version, produced by Emanuele Luzi, and mixed and mastered by Ben Liebrand, was released in 1990, in Germany, Netherlands and Europe, on ZYX Records and Bounce Records.

In Popular Culture 

The song was featured in the film The Last Days of Disco, during the police raid on the disco club.

Charts

Weekly charts

1New version

Year-end charts

Personnel

Music composed and arranged by Pierluigi Giombini
Lyrics: Paul Mazzolini
Keyboards: Pierluigi Giombini
Background vocals: Ryan Paris and Fiona Chapelle
Sound engineer: Giampaolo Bresciani

See also 

 List of number-one hits of 1983 (Flanders)
 List of European number-one hits of 1983
 List of Dutch Top 40 number-one singles of 1983
 List of number-one singles of 1983 (Spain)

References

External links
"Dolce Vita" on the site of the producer
Allmusic: Ryan Paris – Dolce Vita – Appearances

1983 debut singles
1983 songs
Carrere Records singles
Dutch Top 40 number-one singles
Discomagic Records singles
Ryan Paris songs
European Hot 100 Singles number-one singles
English-language Italian songs
Italo disco songs
Number-one singles in Spain
RCA Records singles
Songs with music by Pierluigi Giombini
Ultratop 50 Singles (Flanders) number-one singles
ZYX Music singles